Harlem High School is a public secondary school and part of the Harlem School District 122 in Machesney Park, Illinois, USA. It has approximately 2,600 students. The freshman campus for 9th grade was closed in 2019; new freshmen are incorporated into the main high school. Its sport teams are named the Harlem Huskies.

Demographics and statistics
The Demographics of the school are as follows (Greatest -> Least):
 White - 73.5%
 Hispanic - 13.3%
 Two or More - 6.3%
 Black - 4.3%
 Asian - 2.3%
 American Indian - 0.3%
 Pacific Islander - 0.1%

The rate of graduation is 84%
20% of students are coming in and out of the district in 2019
38% of all students going to the school are missing 10% or more of all school days.

Academics
The school offers several AP courses in such subjects as English Literature and Composition, United States History, and World History. Also offered are CTE (Career and Technical Education) classes through the Career Education Associates of North Central Illinois, a partnership with the Regional Alternative School, and a program in which students can take college level classes through the nearby Rock Valley College.

Athletics
Sports at Harlem are offered on a seasonal basis.  Sports offered include a Historically Football program. Cross country and Track & Field are among the top in the state of Illinois. Also offered are Tennis, Swimming, Golf, Softball, Baseball, Basketball, Cheerleadering, and the Wrestling program that has delivered multiple State Champions .

Extracurricular activities
Harlem has a Science Olympiad Team that often wins the regional competition and proceeds to the state level. Other student organizations include National Honor Society, Key Club, Model UN, and a German Club.

Notable alumni
Robin Zander, lead vocalist and rhythm guitarist for Cheap Trick

References (not all are up to date)

External links
 Harlem High School's 2012 Illinois School Report Card

Educational institutions established in 1910
1910 establishments in Illinois
Public high schools in Illinois
Schools in Winnebago County, Illinois